Frédéric Delcourt (born 14 February 1964) is a French former competition swimmer and Olympic silver medalist.

Delcourt was born in Nord, France.

He competed in three events for France at the 1980 Summer Olympics in Moscow, Russia, including swimming the backstroke leg for the fifth-place French men's 4x100-meter medley relay team.  Delcourt won the silver medal in the men's 200-meter backstroke event at the 1984 Summer Olympics in Los Angeles, California.

Delcourt attended the University of Florida in Gainesville, Florida, where he swam for coach Randy Reese's Florida Gators swimming and diving team in National Collegiate Athletic Association (NCAA) competition in 1984.

See also 
 List of Olympic medalists in swimming (men)
 List of University of Florida alumni
 List of University of Florida Olympians

References 

1964 births
Living people
Sportspeople from Nord (French department)
European Aquatics Championships medalists in swimming
Florida Gators men's swimmers
French male backstroke swimmers
Olympic silver medalists for France
Olympic swimmers of France
Swimmers at the 1980 Summer Olympics
Swimmers at the 1984 Summer Olympics
Medalists at the 1984 Summer Olympics
Olympic silver medalists in swimming
Mediterranean Games gold medalists for France
Swimmers at the 1979 Mediterranean Games
Mediterranean Games medalists in swimming
20th-century French people
21st-century French people